David John Fletcher  (born 1942) is an English author and military historian specialising in the history of armoured warfare, particularly that of the United Kingdom.

He was an employee of The Tank Museum, Bovington from 1982 until December 2012, becoming the museum's longest serving member of staff. Earlier that year, he was a panellist on Operation Think Tank, an international symposium on tanks, held in California. He also presents contemporary media such as YouTube for the Tank Museum.
David Fletcher hosted a regular video series on The Tank Museum YouTube channel called 'Tank Chats', in which he gave viewers a brief insight in to a specific tank in the Museum's collection.

In his final year at Bovington, he was appointed an MBE in the Queens New Year's honours list for services to the history of armoured warfare.

Bibliography 

His publication list is extensive, including 30 books.

References 

British military historians
Historians of the United Kingdom
Historians of armoured warfare
Living people
Historians of World War I
Historians of World War II
Members of the Order of the British Empire
1942 births
Historians of weapons